

Results

Women's under-23 cross-country
UCI